Clingen is a town in Germany.

Clingen may also refer to:

 Clinical Genome Resource

See also
 Clin. Genet. (Clinical Genetics), a medical genetics journal